Sir Edward Battersby Bailey FRS FRSE MC CB LLD (1 July 1881 – 19 March 1965) was an English geologist.

Life

Bailey was born in Marden, Kent, the son of Dr James Battersby Bailey and Louise Florence Carr.

He was educated at Kendal grammar school and Clare College, Cambridge. He gained first-class honours in both parts one and two of the natural sciences tripos. He also won a heavyweight boxing medal while at Cambridge.

From 1915 to 1919 he served as a Lieutenant with the Royal Garrison Artillery and was twice wounded, losing his left eye and much of the use of his left arm. He was awarded the Military Cross and the French Croix de Guerre with palms. He was also made a chevalier of the Légion d'honneur.

He was Vice President of the Royal Society of Edinburgh from 1935 to 1937.

From 1929 to 1937, he held the chair in geology at the University of Glasgow, where he was succeeded by Sir Arthur Elijah Trueman (chair in geology 1937–1946).

He was director of the British Geological Survey from 1937 to 1945.

He was an atheist.

He died in Middlesex Hospital in London. He was cremated at Golders Green Crematorium.

Family

His first wife, Alice Meason, died in 1956. He remarried, to Mary M W Young in 1962.

Publications

Honours and awards
Elected a Fellow of the Royal Society in 1930, in 1943 he was awarded its Royal Medal. In 1948 he received the Wollaston Medal of the Geological Society. He was also a foreign member of the national academies of Belgium, India, Norway, Switzerland, and the United States.

Bailey was a knighted in the 1945 New Year Honours and received the accolade from the King on 13 February 1945.

References

Further reading
 

1881 births
1965 deaths
Fellows of the Royal Society
Foreign associates of the National Academy of Sciences
Wollaston Medal winners
Royal Medal winners
Alumni of Clare College, Cambridge
British Army personnel of World War I
Chevaliers of the Légion d'honneur
Recipients of the Military Cross
Royal Artillery officers
Recipients of the Croix de Guerre 1914–1918 (France)
Academics of the University of Glasgow
English atheists
20th-century British geologists
English knights
People from Marden, Kent